Koob David Hurtado Arboleda (born July 19, 1985) is an Ecuadorian footballer who plays as a centre back for LDU Portoviejo.

Career
In June 2019, Hurtado joined .

References

External links
FEF card 

1985 births
Living people
People from Eloy Alfaro Canton
Association football defenders
Ecuadorian footballers
Ecuadorian expatriate footballers
Ecuadorian Serie A players
C.D. Cuenca footballers
C.D. Técnico Universitario footballers
C.S.D. Independiente del Valle footballers
L.D.U. Loja footballers
L.D.U. Quito footballers
Fuerza Amarilla S.C. footballers
Cobreloa footballers
Guayaquil City F.C. footballers
S.D. Aucas footballers
Mushuc Runa S.C. footballers
L.D.U. Portoviejo footballers
Primera B de Chile players
Ecuadorian expatriate sportspeople in Chile
Expatriate footballers in Chile